The Houston Yacht Club is the oldest yacht club in Texas. In LaPorte, near Houston, it is a member of the Gulf Yachting Association.

History
The HYC was founded in 1897. Originally called the Houston Yacht & Powerboat Club, its name was changed to Houston Yacht Club in 1927, when its current Spanish-style clubhouse was built, which has been declared an historic landmark in the Galveston Bay area of the Gulf Coast. The 27,000 square-foot clubhouse has amenities for boating enthusiasts of all ages, including bar and restaurant facilities, lounges, a ballroom with stage, meeting rooms, shower rooms, and overnight guest rooms. The pink stucco structure is affectionately called the "Pink Palace" by members.

As well as local events, the HYC has hosted many national and international regattas on Galveston Bay. In 1929 and 1941, it hosted the Lipton Cup race. In 2015, it hosted the J22 North American Championship.

Many of the club's sailors have competed nationally and internationally, including Olympic sailors John Kolius and Charlie Ogletree.

References

External links 
 Official website of the Houston Yacht Club

Buildings and structures in Harris County, Texas
La Porte, Texas
Organizations based in Texas
Sailing in Texas
Sports in Harris County, Texas
Yacht clubs in the United States